Walter Surma Tarnopolsky (1 August 193215 September 1993) was a Canadian judge, legal scholar, and pioneer in the development of human rights law and civil liberties in Canada.

Background and education
Walter Surma Tarnopolsky was born on 1 August 1932 in Gronlid, Saskatchewan, to parents of Ukrainian descent. He was educated at the University of Saskatchewan, receiving his BA in 1953 and his LLB in 1957. After completing his undergraduate education, he attended Columbia University, receiving his MA in 1955. He subsequently received his LLM from the London School of Economics.

Career
Tarnopolsky taught law at several Canadian universities, specializing in the fields of human rights and civil liberties. Between 1959 and 1983, he was a professor of law at the University of Saskatchewan, University of Windsor, Osgoode Hall Law School of York University, and the University of Ottawa. He briefly served as the vice-president (Academic) of York University in 1972 and was the dean of Law at the University of Windsor from 1968 to 1972.

From 1977 to 1983, he was a member of the United Nations Human Rights Committee, and in 1985, he was appointed to the Court of Appeal for Ontario. He served on the Court of Appeal until his death on 15 September 1993 in Toronto.

Publications
 Discrimination and the Law in Canada (1982)
 "Freedom of the press" in Newspapers and the Law (1981)
 The Canadian Bill of Rights (1966, 1975)

References

External links
 Walter Surma Tarnopolsky fonds via Library and Archives Canada

1932 births
1993 deaths
Alumni of the London School of Economics
Canadian legal scholars
Canadian officials of the United Nations
Canadian people of Ukrainian descent
Judges in Quebec
Justices of the Court of Appeal for Ontario
United Nations Human Rights Committee members